Amicus was the United Kingdom's second-largest trade union, and the largest private sector union, formed by the merger of Manufacturing Science and Finance and the AEEU (Amalgamated Engineering and Electrical Union), agreed in 2001, and two smaller unions, UNIFI and the GPMU. Amicus also organised in both parts of Ireland and was affiliated to the UK Trades Union Congress, the Irish Congress of Trade Unions and the Scottish Trades Union Congress.

On 1 May 2007 it merged with the TGWU to form Unite, which became the biggest trade union in the UK at the time. It retained that status until late 2018, when it was overtaken in membership numbers by Unison.

Industry representation
Amicus organised workers in almost every industry, predominantly in the private sector. At the 2005 TUC Congress it was reported that Amicus had 1,200,000 members of whom 266,986 were female and 933,014 male.

Political affiliations 
Amicus was affiliated to the Labour Party in Britain, and the Irish Labour Party (Ireland). The Amicus UK Parliamentary Group included about 120 MPs.

Foundation 
When the merger to form Amicus was agreed, the General Secretary of MSF was Roger Lyons, and Sir Ken Jackson led the AEEU. When the merger came into force they both became Joint General Secretaries of Amicus. The AEEU section held an election in July 2002, and Sir Ken Jackson was replaced by Derek Simpson who took office in January 2003. In May 2003, Simpson became General Secretary in his own right following the departure of Lyons.
'Amicus' was chosen from the suggestion of Peter Skinner MEP for the name of this new union for its Latin meaning: friend, comrade (m).

Further mergers 
In late 2004 two other major unions joined Amicus – UNIFI (the union for the finance industry) and the Graphical, Paper and Media Union.

During 2005 discussions started between the TGWU, Amicus and the GMB about the possibility of merging the three unions into one organisation with potentially 2.5 million members covering almost every segment of the economy. On 14 June 2006 the GMB Conference voted not to continue with discussions although the other two unions pursued merger talks. A recall conference of the TGWU held on 18 December 2006 supported the merger (Amicus did not hold a recall conference), and a ballot of both unions' membership during February and early March 2007, also approved the merger. The result of the ballot was announced on 8 March 2007: 70.1% of Amicus members and 86.4% of T&G members voted to support the merger, from a turnout of 27%. The press release announced that the resulting union had the working title "New Union" and the name would be decided by a ballot of the membership. http://www.amicustheunion.org.uk/Default.aspx?page=6049 However, on 2 April, The Times reported that the name Unite had been chosen.

In early April 2007, the BBC announced that Amicus was to begin discussions with North American union, United Steelworkers, about a possible merger. If successful, it would create an international "super union" with more than 3 million members, more able to pressure multinational companies and their managers. UK and US unions in merger talks This project eventually became Workers Uniting, a proposed union resulting from the merger of the United Steelworkers and Amicus' successor Unite.

Organisation 
The supreme decision-making body of Amicus is its Policy Conference which convenes every two years. At other times, the National Executive Council, which meets every two months, is responsible for governance of the union. However, the General Secretary is empowered to make executive decisions in the periods between meetings of the NEC.

Amicus has a corporate office at 35 King Street in London's Covent Garden, and its main administrative centre, Hayes Court, is at Bromley in south-east London. The union runs two of its own colleges, Esher Place at Esher in Surrey and Quorn Grange at Loughborough in Leicestershire, and is a major user of Wortley Hall near Sheffield. A further facility, Whitehall College in Bishop's Stortford, Hertfordshire is currently inactive, following a survey which revealed the presence of large amounts of asbestos which will be expensive to remove. For many years Amicus also owned and operated its own Technical Training Department which was based at Cudham Hall in Kent.

The union operates many other offices across Britain and Ireland to support activity in each of the union's 12 regions. The four unions forming Amicus each had a fully developed network of offices to support their own operations; there is an ongoing exercise to co-locate staff from geographically adjacent offices in order to reduce the property portfolio.

Sectors 
Amicus is primarily a sector-based union. The industrial sectors are responsible for electing the majority of National Executive Committee members, and have the right to submit the majority of motions to the Policy and Rules Conferences. The remainder of NEC positions are regional and women's seats.

Regions 
Amicus has 12 regions – Scotland, Wales, and the island of Ireland together with nine English regions corresponding to the British government's regional development agencies. Each region has a Regional Council which meets every two months and is composed of about 35 delegates, elected by regional Sector, Women's, Equalities and Branch Conferences.

An Amicus region typically contains several hundred branches, each of which represent a smaller group of members, running local campaigns on their behalf and providing a means for members to socialise with one another and increase their involvement in Amicus and the wider union movement. Nationally, there are about 1900 branches. Branches are typically organised on a workplace, geographical or sectoral basis, and vary in size from a few dozen to several thousand members. One reason for the wide variation in branch size and type is that, during the numerous union mergers which culminated in the formation of Amicus, branches were often not forced to merge. For this reason many branches are still based on the structures that existed in long-disappeared unions such as TASS. Some branches are inactive, for example because the workplace they represented no longer exists. In 2005, Amicus began a consultation on reorganisation of branches, primarily intended to close inactive branches or merge them with neighbouring ones which are more active. Not surprisingly this reorganisation was of some concern to branch activists, and prompted a number of neighbouring branches to voluntarily merge in order to pre-empt any action from the centre. Other branches, for example those in the voluntary sector, are by their nature small, and have made representations to the NEC and the General Secretary in which they pointed out that a small branch is not necessarily an inactive one. As of October 2006 the results of the branch consultation have not been published.

Elections and local control 
The sectoral nature of Amicus contrasts with MSF where branches and regions held the majority of control and where branches were entitled to directly elect delegates to national policy and rules conferences. In Amicus, all conference delegates must be elected by a National Sector, Women's or Equalities Conference or a Regional Branch Conference.

In general, committees of the union from branch level upwards must be composed of lay members elected by the group of members they represent, as per MSF custom and practice. A notable exception is for the secretary of a regional or national committee, who is usually a Full-Time Officer employed by the union. However, within the AEEU, branches were often chaired by Officers.

In the 2002 General Secretary election, several officials of the AEEU section admitted to double-voting at different branches after a The Guardian exposure of the practice. In June 2002, The AEEU section London and south-east regional secretary, Roger Maskell, resigned following complaints by candidate Derek Simpson of tampering of computer voting records. Roger Maskell subsequently started a constructive dismissal action at an employment tribunal. In a legal statement the union's head of information systems said he was instructed by a senior official to amend voting software to allow 730,000 members to vote rather than the correct figure of 618,000, by including former members who had left the union in the preceding two years.

A rule change in 2005 provided for the establishment of Area Activist Quarterlies (also known as Area Committees) consisting of workplace representatives and branch officers from a given geographical area, to be smaller than the existing Regions. These resemble the AEEU's District Committees. The first Quarterlies took place in April 2006, and will be convened four times per year. The primary purpose of the Quarterlies is to allow local activists to share information on local issues such as redundancies and industrial disputes, and co-ordinate local campaigns.

Conferences and committees 
As a general rule any candidate for a position on a committee of the union must also be a workplace representative, in order to retain the connection with workplaces. However retired members may hold branch positions; until a rule change in 2005, retired members wishing to hold a position other than Branch Secretary needed the NEC's consent. A further exception is made for the equalities committees where a committee member is expected to be in employment but need not be a representative.

Amicus conferences are organised on a two-yearly cycle with national Policy Conferences taking place in odd-numbered years, and sectoral, national equality and regional branch conferences being held in the intervening years. This differs with MSF and AEEU arrangements where national conferences took place on an annual basis. Similarly, Regional Councils meet every two months as opposed to monthly under MSF.

Due to the two-yearly cycle, Amicus does not have a President, because legislation requires the position to be elected annually - either by delegates to annual conference, or the entire membership. In view of the cost of a national postal ballot, the Chair of the NEC was given the role of chairing the 2005 Policy and Rules Conferences.

The only Rules Conference of Amicus took place in 2005. The next Rules Conference was planned to take place in 2009, but following the merger with the T+G it is now likely to take place in 2010, as part of the wider Unite union.

Caucus groups
A variety of caucus groups exist. The Amicus Unity Gazette has broad left aims and objectives. There was an attempt to launch an "Amicus The Union Network" or ATU Network, whose political position is disputed, but this never really took off. Right of centre groups from the old MSF (MSF For Labour) and AEEU (AEEU United) still operate. Lay members and Amicus employees participate in all these caucuses.

Amicus wrote and created the role of the Trade Union Disability Champion@Work. Funded initially by a European grant under the Year of Disabled People 2003 there are now over a thousand Champions from nearly 40 trade unions operating in workplaces across the UK and Ireland.

General Secretaries
2001–2002: Ken Jackson and Roger Lyons
2003–2004: Derek Simpson and Roger Lyons
2004–2007: Derek Simpson

References

External links

 Archive of official website
 www.amicus.cc unofficial website - 'what's really going on in our union'
 UK and US unions in merger talks - BBC Report

2001 establishments in the United Kingdom
Defunct trade unions of Ireland
Defunct trade unions of the United Kingdom
General unions
Trade unions established in 2001
Trade unions disestablished in 2007
Unite the Union
Trade unions based in London